Trunko is the nickname for a large unidentified lump of flesh or a decomposed sea creature, a so-called "globster", reportedly sighted in Margate, South Africa on 25 October 1924. The initial source for Trunko was an article entitled "Fish Like A Polar Bear" published on 27 December 1924, edition of London's Daily Mail. The animal was reportedly first seen off the coast battling two killer whales, which fought the unusual creature for three hours. One of the witnesses, South African farmer Hugh Ballance, described the animal as looking like a "giant polar bear" due to what was thought to be dense-white fur.

The creature reputedly washed up on Margate Beach but despite being there for 10 days, no scientist investigated the carcass while it was beached, so no reliable description has been published, and until September 2010 it was assumed that no photographs of it had ever been published. Some people who have never been identified were reported to have described the animal as possessing snowy-white fur, and an elephantine trunk.

Commenting on the photos, paleontologist Darren Naish wrote:

References

Bibliography

Globsters
1924 in South Africa